Generative systems are technologies with the overall capacity to produce unprompted change driven by large, varied, and uncoordinated audiences. When generative systems provide a common platform, changes may occur at varying layers (physical, network, application, content) and provide a means through which different firms and individuals may cooperate indirectly and contribute to innovation.

Depending on the rules, the patterns can be extremely varied and unpredictable.  One of the better-known examples is Conway's Game of Life, a cellular automaton. Other examples include Boids and Wikipedia. More examples can be found in generative music, generative art, and, more recently, in video games such as Spore.

Theory

Jonathan Zittrain 
In 2006, Jonathan Zittrain published The Generative Internet in Volume 119 of the Harvard Law Review. In this paper, Zittrain describes a technology's degree of generativity as being the function of four characteristics:

 Capacity for leverage – the extent to which an object enables something to be accomplished that would not have otherwise be possible or worthwhile.
 Adaptability – how widely a technology can be used without it needing to be modified.
 Ease of mastery – how much effort and skill is required for people to take advantage of the technology's leverage.
 Accessibility – how easily people are able to start using a technology.

See also

References

External links 
 A talk on generative systems by Will Wright and Brian Eno for the Long Now Foundation
 The Future of the Internet and How to Stop it; Yale University Press (2008)
 Early generative computer graphics by Herber W. Franke
 Generative Systeme by Benedikt Groß and Julia Laub
 Bugworld - a generative vermin installation by Philipp Sackl, Markus Jaritz & Thomas Gläser

Complex systems theory